Donald Powell Cole (March 21, 1941 in Bryan, Texas) is a noted anthropologist at the American University in Cairo.  He joined the university in 1971. He is a member of the American Anthropological Association. Cole has studied Arab nomadic cultures, such as the Al Murrah, in his The Social and Economic Structure of the Āl Murrah: A Saudi Arabian Bedouin Tribe, his PhD dissertation at the University of California, Berkeley.

Cole, an American expat, currently resides in Cairo.

Academic positions
The American University in Cairo
	Assistant Professor, 1971–73; 1974–75
	Associate Professor, 1975–86
	Professor, 1986 to 2007
	Emeritus Professor, 2007 onward
University of California, Berkeley
	Acting Assistant Professor, Spring Quarter 1971
	Visiting Assistant Professor, 1973–74
The University of Chicago
	Visiting Associate Professor, Winter and Spring Quarters 1976
University of Texas, Austin
	Visiting Associate Professor, Spring Semester 1983, plus several summer sessions
	Visiting Scholar, Center for Middle East Studies, Spring Semester 1987
Georgetown University
	Visiting Researcher, Center for Contemporary Arab Studies, Spring Semester 1995

Books

Road to Islām: From Texas to Saudi Arabia and Egypt / Donald Powell Cole. Cairo: Al-Madinah Press, 2010.
Bedouins of the Empty Quarter / Donald Powell Cole. New Jersey: Aldine Transaction, 2010. 
Bedouin, settlers, and holiday makers : Egypt's changing northwest cast / Donald P. Cole, Soraya Altorki. 1998. 
Investors and Workers in the Western Desert of Egypt: An Exploratory Survey / Donald Powell Cole, Naiem A. Sherbiny and Nadia Makary Girgis. Cairo: Cairo Papers in Social Science, Volume 15, Monograph 3. 1992.
Arabian oasis city : the transformation of ʻUnayzah / Soraya Altorki and Donald P. Cole.  Austin : University of Texas Press, 1989. 	
Saudi Arabian Bedouin: An Assessment of their Needs / Donald Powell Cole and Saad Eddin Ibrahim. Cairo: Cairo Papers in Social Science, Volume 5, Monograph 1. 1978.
Nomads of the nomads : the Āl Murrah Bedouin of the Empty Quarter / Donald Powell Cole. 1975  (hardcover),  (paperback)

Other published works
1971: "Al Murrah Bedouin: The 'Pure Ones' Rove Arabia’s Empty Sands". In Nomads of the World, 52–71. Washington, DC: The National Geographic Society.
1973: "Bedouin of the Oil Fields". Natural History LXXXII(9):94–103.
1973: "The Enmeshment of Nomads in Saudi Arabian Society: The Case of the Al Murrah". In Cynthia Nelson (ed.), The Desert and the Sown: Nomads in the Wider Society, 113–128. Berkeley: University of California, Institute of International Studies, Research Series, Number 21.
1980: "Pastoral Nomads in a Rapidly Changing Economy: The Case of Saudi Arabia". In Timothy Niblock (ed.), Social and Economic Development in the Arab Gulf, 106–121. London: Croom Helm.
1982: "Tribal and Non-Tribal Structures among the Bedouin of Saudi Arabia". Al-Abhath XXX:77–94.
1984: "Alliance and Descent in the Middle East and the 'Problem' of Patrilateral Parallel Cousin Marriage". In Akbar S. Ahmed and David M. Hart (eds), Islam in Tribal Societies: From the Atlas to the Indus, 169–186. London: Routledge and Kegan Paul.
1984: "Modern Egypt". Discovery 8(3):8-12. (Robert A. Fernea, co-author).
1985: "The Bedouin in a Changing World". Cairo Today 6(9):23–31.
1990: "Mujtama’a ma qabl an-naft fi al-jazirah al-‘arabiyyah: fawdah qabiliyyah am mujtama’a muraqab". Al-Mustaqbal al-‘arabi 11:41–53. (Soraya Altorki, co-author).
1992: "Was Arabia Tribal? A Reinterpretation of the Pre-Oil Society.” Journal of South Asian and Middle Eastern Studies XV(4):71-87.
1993: "Commerce et  production dans le nord de l’Aarabie centrale: changement et development a 'Unayzah". In Riccardo Bocco, Ronald Jaubert and Francoise Metral (eds), Steppes d’Arabies: Etats, pasteurs, agriculture et commerçants: le devinir des zones seches,  247–265. Paris: Presses Universitaires de France; Geneva: Cahiers de L'I.U.E.D. (Soraya Altorki, co-author).
1994: "Private Sector Enterprises in Desert Development in Egypt". In Mohammed Atif Kishk (ed.), Land Reclamation and Development in Egypt, 401–414. Minia: Minia University Press.
1996: "Land Tenure, Bedouin, and Development in the Northwest Coast". In Sustainable Development in Egypt: Current and Emerging Challenges, 108–110. Cairo: The American University in Cairo, Office of Graduate Studies and Research.
1997: "Change in Saudi Arabia: A View from ‘Paris of Najd. In Nicholas S. Hopkins and Saad Eddin Ibrahim (eds), Arab Society: Class, Gender, Power and Development, 29–52. Cairo: The American University in Cairo Press. (Soraya Altorki, co-author).
1997: Unayzah, le 'Paris du Najd': le changement en Arabie saoudite". Monde arabe: Maghreb-Machrek 156:3–22. (Soraya Altorki, co-author).
1998: "Guide to the MT09 Libyan Bedouin File". HRAF Collection of Ethnography, Installment 47 (CD-ROM). New Haven: Human Relations Area Files.
1998: "Agro-Pastoralism and Development in Egypt’s Northwest Coast". In Directions of Change in Rural Egypt, eds. Nicholas S. Hopkins and Kirsten Westergaard, 318-333. Cairo: The American University in Cairo Press. (Soraya Altorki, co-author).
1998: "The Northwest Coast: A Part of Rural Egypt?” In Nicholas S. Hopkins and Kirsten Westergaard (eds), Directions of Change in Rural Egypt, 130–143. Cairo: The American University in Cairo Press. (Soraya Altorki, co-author).
1998: "Twenty Years of Desert Development in Egypt". Cairo Papers in Social Science 21(4):44–54. (Soraya Altorki, co-author).
2000: "Production and Trade in North Central Arabia: Change and Development in 'Unayzah". In Martha Mundy and Basim Musallam (eds), The Transformation of Nomadic Society in the Arab East, 145–159. Cambridge: Cambridge University Press.
2001: "Saudi Arabia". In Melvin Ember and Carol R. Ember (eds), Countries and their Cultures, 1927–1939. New York: Macmillan Reference.
2002: "Riyadh". Encyclopedia of Urban Cultures, eds. Melvin Ember and Carol R. Ember, 4:38–45. Danbury, CT: Grolier.
2003: "Where Have the Bedouin Gone?" Anthropological Quarterly 76(2):235–267.
2005: "Al Murrah Tribes in the Days of King 'Abd al-'Aziz".
2006: "New Homes, New Occupations, New Pastoralism: Al Murrah Bedouin, 1968–2003". In Dawn Chatty (ed.), Nomadic Societies in the Middle East and North Africa: Entering the 21st Century, 370–392. Leiden and Boston: Brill.
2006: "Land and Identity among Awlad 'Ali Bedouin: Egypt's Northwest Coast". In Dawn Chatty (ed.), Nomadic Societies in the Middle East and North Africa: Entering the 21st Century, 634–653. Leiden and Boston: Brill. (Soraya Altorki, co-author).

Published academic interviews
2000	Mark Allen Peterson. “The Long Walk II:  ‘For as long as I can remember Anthropology has been reinventing itself’: An interview with Donald Powell Cole.” Nomadic Peoples 4(2):7-20.
2002	Hussein Fahim. “Hadith anthrubulujiya maa duktur Donald Cole” [Anthropological discussion with Dr. Donald Cole]. Journal of the Social Sciences. Kuwait: Kuwait University, Fall 2002.

References

American anthropologists
Anthropology educators
UC Berkeley College of Letters and Science alumni
Academic staff of The American University in Cairo
1941 births
Living people
American expatriates in Egypt